Mongolia competed at the 2012 Summer Olympics in London, from 27 July to 12 August 2012. This was the nation's twelfth appearance at the Olympics, except the 1984 Summer Olympics in Los Angeles, because of its partial support to the Soviet boycott.

The Mongolian National Olympic Committee sent the nation's largest delegation to the Games since 1992. A total of 29 athletes, 16 men and 13 women, competed in 7 sports. The Mongolian team featured past Olympic champions, including judoka Naidangiin Tüvshinbayar, who became the nation's first ever gold medalist, and pistol shooter Otryadyn Gündegmaa, who won the silver in Beijing. Marathon runner Ser-Od Bat-Ochir, who competed at his third Olympics, was Mongolia's flag bearer at the opening ceremony.

This was Mongolia's most successful Olympics, winning the total of five Olympic medals (2 silver and 3 bronze), and surpassing the record by just a single medal short from Beijing. All of these medals were awarded to the athletes in boxing, judo, and wrestling. Judoka Naidangiin Tüvshinbayar became the first Mongolian athlete to win two medals in Olympic history, including the silver in London. Meanwhile, boxer Nyambayaryn Tögstsogt, the youngest member of the contingent, at age 20, claimed the silver medal in men's flyweight division. Through social media, Mongolia dominated the standings as the nation with the most tweets for these Olympic games.

Medalists

Archery

Mongolia has qualified one archer for the men's individual event and one archer for the women's individual event

Athletics

Mongolian athletes have so far achieved qualifying standards in the following athletics events (up to a maximum of 3 athletes in each event at the 'A' Standard, and 1 at the 'B' Standard):

Key
 Note – Ranks given for track events are within the athlete's heat only
 Q = Qualified for the next round
 q = Qualified for the next round as a fastest loser or, in field events, by position without achieving the qualifying target
 NR = National record
 N/A = Round not applicable for the event
 Bye = Athlete not required to compete in round

Men

Women

Boxing

Four Mongolian boxers competed in London, all in the men's competitions; two medals were won by the team.

Men

Judo

The final competitors' list was announced on 7 June.

Men

Women

Shooting

Men

Women

Swimming 

Two athletes will compete by invitation.

Men

Women

Wrestling

Mongolia has so far qualified the following quota places.

Key
  – Victory by Fall.
  – Decision by Points – the loser with technical points.
  – Decision by Points – the loser without technical points.

Men's freestyle

Women's freestyle

References

External links
Olympics 2012: the alternative medals table-Guardian.co.uk
Olympic medal per capita-medalspercapita.com
GDP per capita-billmitchell.org

Nations at the 2012 Summer Olympics
2012
2012 in Mongolian sport